Ectropis is a genus in the geometer moth family (Geometridae). They are mostly paleotropical, but also plentiful in Australia and extend into Asia. Only one species – or cryptic species complex – (the engrailed/small engrailed, E. bistortata/E. crepuscularia) is found in Europe. There are about 100 known species in this genus.

Systematics and taxonomy
All junior synonyms of Ectropis use G. crepuscularia as type species, and thus, even though this large genus might warrant subgeneric division, no names are presently available. Apart from Tephrosia, established by Jean Baptiste Boisduval in 1840, the synonyms are also junior homonyms and consequently completely invalid.

One of them, Coenobita, was proposed by Johannes von Nepomuk Franz Xaver Gistel in 1848. Gistl was unaware that Jacob Hübner had described the genus Ectropis, but he knew of Boisduval's Tephrosia. However, Gistl misread the name of the spider genus Theraphosa (established by Charles Athanase Walckenaer in 1805) as Tephrosia, and thus came to believe that Tephrosia was in need of a new name. He chose Coenobita, which to his misfortune had been given to a genus of hermit crabs by Pierre André Latreille in 1829 already.

The other preoccupied synonym, Boarmia, had earlier been given to closely related moths. That group is now included in Hypomecis, which thus has become the type genus of the tribe Boarmiini in the geometer moth subfamily Ennominae. Ectropis is also a member of the Boarmiini.

Selected species
Species of Ectropis include:

Some species formerly included here are now placed elsewhere, e.g. in Calcyopa, Myrioblephara or Parectropis

Footnotes

References

  (2010): Australian Faunal Directory – Ectropis. Version of 28 May 2010. Retrieved 21 April 2011.
  (2011): Ectropis. Version 2.4, 27 January 2011. Retrieved 21 April 2011.
  (2004a): Butterflies and Moths of the World, Generic Names and their Type-species – Boarmia Stephens, 1829. Version of 5 November 2004. Retrieved 21 April 2011.
  (2004b): Butterflies and Moths of the World, Generic Names and their Type-species – Coenobita Gistl, 1848. Version of 5 November 2004. Retrieved 21 April 2011.
  (2004c): Butterflies and Moths of the World, Generic Names and their Type-species – Ectropis. Version of 5 November 2004. Retrieved 21 April 2011.
  (2010): Lepidoptera and Some Other Life Forms "Ectropis". Version of 4 July 2010. Retrieved 21 April 2011.

Boarmiini
Taxa named by Michael Denis
Taxa named by Ignaz Schiffermüller